"Vampire" is the third Japanese single by South Korean–Japanese girl group Iz*One. It was released in Japan by EMI Records on September 25, 2019.

Lyrics
The lyrics of the song talk  about wanting to be a vampire so the members can turn a love they long for into an invulnerable one.

Track listing 
Physical releases include DVDs with music video for the title track.

All lyrics written by Yasushi Akimoto. Track "Love Bubble" is written by Cho Yoon-kyung, Sakura Miyawaki and Kim Min-ju.

Charts

Certifications

References

Iz*One songs
2019 singles
2019 songs
Songs about vampires
Songs with lyrics by Yasushi Akimoto
Oricon Weekly number-one singles
Billboard Japan Hot 100 number-one singles